Saiyan Magan Pahelwani Mein is a 1981 Indian Bhojpuri-language drama film directed by Radhakant. The film was released on 1 Jan 1981 and stars Sujit Kumar and Padma Khanna.

References

External links

1980s Bhojpuri-language films